The 1181 papal election followed the death of Pope Alexander III and resulted in the election of Pope Lucius III. This was the first papal election celebrated in accordance with the decree Licet de evitanda discordia, promulgated in the Third Lateran Council in 1179, which established that the pope is elected by a majority of two thirds votes.

Licet de evitanda discordia

The contested papal election, 1159, which resulted in the election of Pope Alexander III and Antipope Victor IV (1159-1164), created a schism in the Catholic Church that lasted almost twenty years (until 1178). In 1159 the cardinals were unable to achieve consensus, though an electoral compact had set that as its goal. The cardinals had been divided into two parties, those who favored the Emperor Frederick Barbarossa and those who favored William I of Sicily, and each of them elected their own pope. In August 1178 Antipope Callixtus III, the successor of Victor IV, finally submitted to Alexander III. In the following year Alexander III celebrated the Third Lateran Council, which promulgated the decree Licet de evitanda discordia. To avoid schism in the future, the decree established that the pope is elected with the majority of two thirds of the cardinals, if unanimity cannot be achieved. It confirmed also that the cardinals are the sole electors of the pope.

Election of Lucius III

Pope Alexander III died on August 30, 1181 in Civita Castellana. Two days later, on September 1, 1181, the cardinals assembled at Rome (probably at Lateran or Vatican Basilica) and unanimously elected the senior member of the Sacred College, Cardinal Ubaldo of Lucca, Bishop of Ostia. He took the name Lucius III. On September 6, 1181 he was crowned by Cardinal Teodino of Porto at Velletri.

Cardinal-electors

There were probably 27 cardinals in the Sacred College of Cardinals in 1181. Based on the examination of the subscriptions of the papal bulls in 1181 and the available data about the external missions of the cardinals it is possible to establish that no more than 19 cardinals participated in the election:

Thirteen electors were created by Pope Alexander III, four by Pope Adrian IV, one by Pope Innocent II and one by Lucius II.

Absentee cardinals

Notes

Sources
Adams, John Paul (2011). "Sede Vacante 1181". California State University Northridge. Retrieved: 10 February 2022.

 Gregorovius, Ferdinand (1905). The History of Rome in the Middle Ages Vol. IV, part 2. 2nd ed. London: George Bell 1905.

 

12th-century elections
1181
1181
12th-century Catholicism
1181 in Europe